The University of Tartu (UT;) is a university in the city of Tartu in Estonia. It is the national university of Estonia.  It is the only classical university in the country, and also its biggest and most prestigious university. It was founded under the name of Academia Gustaviana in 1632 by Baron Johan Skytte, the Governor-General (1629–1634) of Swedish Livonia, Ingria, and Karelia, with the required ratification provided by his long-time friend and former student – from age 7 –, King Gustavus Adolphus, shortly before the king's death on 6 November in the Battle of Lützen (1632), during the Thirty Years' War (1618–1648).

Nearly 14,300 students are at the university, of whom over 1,800 are foreign students. The language of instruction in most curricula is Estonian, some more notable exceptions are taught in English, such as semiotics, applied measurement science, computer science, information technology law, and European Union–Russia studies.

The historical buildings of the university are included in the European Heritage Label list as "embodiment of the ideas of a university in the Age of Enlightenment". The university is a member of the Coimbra Group and the Utrecht Network.

History

Academia Gustaviana
The Academia Gustaviana in the then-Swedish province of Livonia was the second university founded in the Swedish Empire, following Uppsala University (in Uppsala, Sweden proper) and preceding the Academy of Åbo (in Turku, Finland). A precursor to the academy had been a Jesuit grammar school Gymnasium Dorpatense, founded by Stefan Batory (then king of Poland–Lithuania) in 1583 and existing to 1601, when Tartu (Dorpat) was under Polish–Lithuanian rule.

The first students matriculated between 20 and 21 April 1632. The opening ceremony of Academia Dorpatensis (Academia Gustaviana) took place on 15 October in the same year. The academy in Tartu functioned with philosophy, law, theology, and medical faculties enjoying the privileges of the University of Uppsala. On account of the Russian–Swedish war, the University of Tartu moved to Tallinn in 1656, and in 1665, it closed down. In the 17th century, the future outstanding Swedish scholars Urban Hiärne, Olof Verelius, and others studied at the university.

With the reestablishment of the university in 1690 as the Academia Gustavo-Carolina, Tartu became a university town again. Academic staff of the new university included , professor of mathematics (the first in the world to deliver lectures based on Newton's theory), professor of rhetoric and poetry, professor of medicine (founder of balneology, and discoverer of natural mineral water springs) and Michael Dau, professor of philosophy as well as of rhetoric and poetry. Just under a decade after being reconstituted, as a result of the coalition against Sweden (Russia, Denmark-Norway, and Saxony-Poland-Lithuania) and the Great Famine of 1695–1697, the university moved from Tartu to Pärnu. Eventually, Academia Gustavo-Carolina, which had opened in Pärnu on 28 August 1699, was closed as a result of the surrender of Pärnu to Russian forces on 12 August 1710 during the Great Northern War. According to the terms of the capitulation, the Russians agreed to maintain the university in Pärnu. However, the university was only reopened in 1802 by the Baltic German Ritterschaften, when the new German-speaking University was relaunched and had its new charter confirmed by the reform-minded Tsar Alexander I of Russia.

Universität Dorpat 

The university was reopened by the Baltic Germans in Estonia in April 1802. The language of instruction at Dorpat was German from 1802 to 1893. During that time, Dorpat had a dual nature in that it belonged both to the set of German(-language) and Russian universities. Financially and administratively, the latter was more important; intellectually and regarding the professoriate and students, the former was more important (over half the professors came from Germany, at least another third were Baltic Germans). Among the 30 German-language universities, of which 23 were inside the German Empire, Dorpat was the 11th in size. In teaching, the university educated the local Baltic German leadership and professional classes, as well as staff, especially for the administration and health system of the entire Russian Empire. In scholarship, it was an international university; the time between 1860 and 1880 was its "golden age".

The freedom to be a half-German university ceased with the rise of nationalist tendencies in Russia, which held homogenization more important than retaining a bilingual university. Between 1882 and 1898, russification in language, appointments, etc., was imposed, with some exceptions (such as the Divinity School, which the state feared would be used by the Orthodox clergy to teach dangerous Protestant views and was thus allowed to continue in German until 1916). By 1898, when both the town and the university were renamed Yuryev, virtually all distinguished scholars from Germany had left. The University of Yuryev existed until 1918, when during part of the fall term, it was reopened, under German occupation, as Dorpat. Russian academic staff and students took refuge in Voronezh in Russia, giving rise to the foundation of Voronezh State University, which traces its own history back to the foundation of the University of Tartu and still holds several physical properties of the latter.

University of Tartu (1919–) 
Since Estonia became independent in 1918, the University of Tartu has been an Estonian-language institution since 1919. The university was named Ostland-Universität in Dorpat during the German occupation of Estonia in 1941–1944 and Tartu State University (Estonian: Tartu Riiklik Ülikool) in 1940–1941 and 1944–1989, during the Soviet occupation. During Soviet rule, although Estonian remained the principal language of instruction, some courses were taught in Russian, with several Russian curricula. Estonia regained independence in 1991, and the full recovery of academic autonomy of the university can be dated to 1992 with the introduction of financial and academic strategic planning. Presently, no courses are taught in Russian.

The last decade has been marked by organizational and structural changes, as well as adaptations to various university models (American, Scandinavian, German) against the background of the Soviet and Baltic German past. Most recently, the university has been and is still being marked by the adaptation of the Bologna declaration in Estonia generally and Tartu specifically, leading to major changes in curricula and studies, as well as by strong organizational centralization attempts. Recent plans also include the abolition of the Chair system (an Americanization) and of the faculties, which is supposed to lead to four large divisions (humanities, social sciences, natural sciences, and medicine) under briefly serving deans and rector-appointed financial administrators.

Buildings

The university's four museums,  botanical gardens, and sports facilities are, by and large, open to the general public. The university possesses some 150 buildings, 30 of which are outside of Tartu; 31 of its buildings decorate the city as architectural monuments. However, the current reforms include attempts to sell, or have the state co-sponsor, several of these buildings and monuments, as well as sports facilities, as they are not seen as part of the university's mission proper.

At the same time, numerous university buildings and student dormitories have been recently constructed or renovated, such as the Von Bock House. Many of the new buildings are built at Maarjamõisa (about 2 km southwest of the historical university centre), such as the Technology Institute, the Biomedical Center, the Chemistry building, and the new Physics building.

Research

Lectinology, the science of lectins, was founded at the University of Tartu in 1888 with the publication of Peter Hermann Stillmark's thesis about the isolation of ricin.

According to the university administration, the most remarkable recent research achievements have been in the fields of molecular and cell biology, laser medicine, materials science, laser spectroscopy, biochemistry, and psychology.

UT is the flagship of Estonian science, ranking in the top 1% of the world's most-cited universities and research institutions in these fields (as of March 2018):

Clinical medicine
Chemistry
Environment and ecology
Geoscience
Plant and animal science
Social sciences
Molecular biology and genetics
Biology and biochemistry
Neuroscience and behaviour
Psychiatry and psychology.

UT accounts for 56% of Estonia's national research output. Also, more than half of the PhD theses in Estonia are defended at UT and over 2,000 high-level research articles (those covered by citation indices like "SCI Expanded", "SSCI", or "A&HCI") are published annually. About 50 UT scientists are among the top 1% of the most-cited scientists in the world.

UT has excelled among the Baltic universities in winning European Research Council grants. The prestigious ERC grant has been awarded to Professor of Molecular Systems Biology Mart Loog, Professor of Nanomedicine Tambet Teesalu, and Professor of International Law Lauri Mälksoo.

Entrepreneurship 

University of Tartu has contracts with 154 business partners in the amount of 10.2 million euros. UT is one of the largest development partners for the private and public sector in the Baltics. The university also works closely with international businesses such as Swedbank, The Linde Group, Pfizer, ABB Corporate Research, SUPER APPLI Inc, Eesti Energia Group, Telia AS, and many more.

UT has spun off more than 60 start-ups, including software companies Reach-U and Positium providing location-based solutions, biotechnology company Icosagen etc. The success story of the last 15 years is the technology for the ME-3 strain of Lactobacillus fermentum bacterium, allowing its use in the food industry. Student satellite ESTCube-1, developed collectively by UT staff and students, and successfully deployed into orbit in 2013, made Estonia the 41st space nation in the world. Scientists from UT and the Estonian University of Life Sciences have developed a new peat-based material that enables building inexpensive energy-efficient 3D-printed houses. The innovative robotic mannequin technology known as Rakuten Fits Me, a virtual dressing room, was originally developed in cooperation with researchers of UT Institute of Technology.

UT encourages its students and scholars to develop an entrepreneurial mindset and apply their knowledge to the economy. The university has set a goal to integrate entrepreneurship courses into every curriculum.

Structure 
The academic structure of the university consists of institutes and colleges of four faculties (valdkond).

While mainly located in Tartu, the university also operates in Narva, Pärnu, Tallinn, and Viljandi. Narva and Pärnu Colleges are part of the Faculty of Social Sciences, Viljandi Culture Academy belongs to the Faculty of Arts and Humanities. The School of Law Tallinn office, University of Tartu Tallinn representation and the Estonian Marine Institute are located in the Estonian capital.

Studies 
Nearly a quarter of the whole Estonian university student population studies at the University of Tartu. While most of the curricula are taught in Estonian, a number of degree programmes have English as a medium of instruction.

About 35% of UT's study courses are offered partly or fully online – as web-based courses in Moodle, video lectures, webinars, e-portfolios, and massive open online courses.

Some 56 bachelor's and 72 master's programmes are available, including 26 programmes in English.

Bachelor's studies 
The university offers 56 different curricula on the bachelor's level, including the open university curriculum. Three bachelor's degree programmes out of 56 are fully taught in English:
 Business administration
 Medicine
 Science and technology

Master's studies 
University of Tartu has 72 study programmes on master's level. These programmes include 24 international master's programmes in English:

Humanities 
 Philosophy
 Semiotics
Sound and Visual Technology
 Folkloristics and heritage studies
 European Languages and Cultures

Social sciences 
 Contemporary Asian and Middle Eastern Studies
Educational technology
 European Union – Russia studies
 Democracy and governance
 Information technology law
 Innovation and technology management
 International law and human rights
 International relations and regional studies
 Quantitative economics
 Wellness and spa service design and management

Science and technology 
 Actuarial and financial engineering
 Applied measurement science
Bioengineering
 Computer science
 Excellence in analytical chemistry
 Geoinformatics for urbanised society
Materials Science and Technology
 Robotics and computer engineering
 Software engineering

Doctoral studies 
Around 120 doctoral degrees are defended annually, which make up more than half of the total number in Estonia. The language of instruction for most of the PhD programmes (35) is English. Four programmes at least partly have Estonian as a medium of instruction. These programmes are: Estonian and Finno-Ugric Linguistics, Law, History, and Pharmacy.

In addition, over 45,000 learners typically enroll in lifelong learning courses each year.

Rankings and reputation

The QS World University Rankings ranked the University of Tartu 296st in the world in 2023, and the top-ranked university in the Baltics. The university is also ranked 3rd in the Emerging Europe and Central Asia region. The Times Higher Education World University Rankings placed it in the 251–300 range among world universities. It is the only university in the Baltic countries to place among the top 200 universities in Europe. UT belongs to top 1% of world's most cited universities in 10 research areas.
University of Tartu also won first place in Central and Eastern Europe by a number of venture capital money raised by the unicorn startups founded by its alumni.

Alumni

According to the university, as of 2016, Tartu alumni comprise 100% of Estonian judges; 99% of Estonian doctors, dentists, and pharmacists; 95% of Estonian judicial prosecutors; 87% of members of the Estonian Bar Association; 60% of the ministers in the Estonian government; and 40% of the members of the Riigikogu (Estonian Parliament).

International cooperation
The University of Tartu has around 1,800 international students from 90 countries. The vast majority come from Ukraine, Russia, and Finland.
In the Erasmus programme for student exchange, the University of Tartu cooperates with more than 800 universities.

The university has also received good reviews from foreign students and an International Student Satisfaction Award based on student feedback.

The University of Tartu participates in the LERU-CE7 (LERU and a group of Central-European universities), the European University Association EUA, Coimbra Group, The Guild of European Research Intensive Universities, and the Utrecht Network. It has signed bilateral co-operation agreements with about 70 universities.

See also 
 List of early modern universities in Europe
Tartu University Clinic
Tartu University Library
Tartu University Press
Tartu Semiotic School
Copenhagen-Tartu school
Tartu Ülikool 350
University of Tartu Old Observatory
Tartu Students' Nature Conservation Circle

References

Bibliography

 
 Die Universitäten Dorpat/Tartu, Riga und Wilna/Vilnius 1579–1979. Beiträge zu ihrer Geschichte und ihrer Wirkung im Grenzbereich zwischen West und Ost. Herausgegeben von Gert von Pistohlkors, Toivo U. Raun, Paul Kaegbein. Köln; Wien 1987 (Quellen und Studien zur baltischen Geschichte; 9). [Zweites Internationales Marburger Symposium zu Problemen der baltischen Sozial- und Kulturgeschichte].  [Lectures in German and English]

Further reading

External links

 
 University of Tartu Official YouTube Channel

 
Universities and colleges in Estonia
1632 establishments in Sweden
Educational institutions established in the 1630s
17th-century establishments in Estonia
Tourist attractions in Tartu
Buildings and structures in Tartu